A Loud Silence is the first studio album by the Portuguese singer-songwriter and producer Renato Freitas, under the pseudonym Lizzy's Husband. It was recorded during 2013.

Two singles were released from the album, "Petrichor" and "A Place for the Ghosts", with a music video for the first produced by Freitas, premiering on the national TV channel, RTP, music show Poplusa.

The album was released digitally under a Creative Commons license (Attribution-NonCommercial-NoDerivs 3.0 Unported (CC BY-NC-ND 3.0)).
In December 2015, Bandcom created an online poll, "Best Portuguese Album of the Year", in which the album was included and nominated.

Album information
The album is primarily an electronic oriented album, with industrial, ambient and dance elements in some songs. Lyrically, the album leads with themes such as anxiety, death, self-destruction, low self esteem and anger management issues, with Freitas saying that the lyrics were written when he "moved from Guimarães to Porto and it was socially hard to adapt to it. I guess that's why the album has such a dark mood in it".

On the label's press release, Jorge Carvalho described it as "finding balance in the less stable madness of its structure, but stays true to the essence of the project. An album that, despite the immaturity, rhythm and cruelty in it, which transports us to an environment of great vibes, does not convey a happy life in the birth of this project, due to the dark lyrics of the songs. [The album] portrays nothing more, nothing less, than a less good phase of the producer’s personal life. A silence that, despite loud and intense, doesn’t seem to escape from a physical body to the outside." Musicians such as Trent Reznor, from Nine Inch Nails, and Björk have been cited as major influences on the album's production and musical direction.

The album was entirely recorded in Renato's house, using a laptop and a microphone, thus the sound presents a very "lo-fi" characteristic. In a 2017 interview with esQrever, Freitas said that music was the key factor that helped him coming out as transgender, citing "A Place for the Ghosts" and "The Weight of the World" as songs that reflect his struggles with gender identity, describing the first as an "inner battle between genders".

Track listing 
Track listing attained from the label's website.

Personnel
 Renato Freitas – production, compositions, lyrics, vocals, keyboards and art direction.

References

2013 debut albums